The men's 1500 metres at the 2008 Summer Olympics took place on 15–19 August at the Beijing National Stadium. Forty-eight athletes from 30 nations competed. 

The qualifying standards were 3:36.60 (A standard) and 3:39.00 (B standard).

The initial winner, Rashid Ramzi of Bahrain, tested positive for the blood-booster CERA and was disqualified on November 18, 2009. After the disqualification, the event was won by Asbel Kiprop of Kenya, the nation's fourth title in the event. It was the fourth straight Games with a Kenyan on the podium in the event; the United States (six times from 1896 to 1920) and Great Britain (four times from 1908 to 1924) were the only other nations to have accomplished that. Nicholas Willis's silver was New Zealand's first medal in the men's 1500 metres since 1976. Mehdi Baala's bronze was France's first medal in the event since 1960.

Background

This was the 26th appearance of the event, which is one of 12 athletics events to have been held at every Summer Olympics. Five finalists from 2004 returned: silver medalist Bernard Lagat (who since immigrated from Kenya to the United States), fifth-place finisher Ivan Heshko of Ukraine, seventh-place finisher Reyes Estévez of Spain, tenth-place finisher Mulugeta Wendimu of Ethiopia, and eleventh-place finisher Kamal Boulahfane of Algeria. Rashid Ramzi of Bahrain, a semifinalist in 2004, was now the favorite, with the two men who had medalled in both 2000 and 2004 either retired (Hicham El Guerrouj) or competing but injured (Lagat).

Ecuador, Eritrea, and Serbia each made their first appearance in the event. The United States made its 25th appearance, most of all nations (having missed only the boycotted 1980 Games).

Qualification

Each National Olympic Committee (NOC) was able to enter up to three entrants providing they had met the A qualifying standard (3:36.00) in the qualifying period (1 January 2007 to 23 July 2008). NOCs were also permitted to enter one athlete providing he had met the B standard (3:39.00) in the same qualifying period.

Competition format

The competition was again three rounds (used previously in 1952 and since 1964). The "fastest loser" system introduced in 1964 was used for both the first round and semifinals. The 12-man semifinals and finals introduced in 1984 and used since 1992 were retained. The field was slightly larger than in past Games, expanding the number of heats from three to four.

There were four heats in the first round, each with 12 or 13 runners (before withdrawals). The top five runners in each heat, along with the next four fastest overall, advanced to the semifinals. The 24 semifinalists were divided into two semifinals, each with 12 runners. The top five men in each semifinal, plus the next two fastest overall, advanced to the 12-man final.

Records

Prior to this competition, the existing world and Olympic records were as follows:

No new world or Olympic records were set for this event. The following national records were established during the competition:

Schedule

All times are China Standard Time (UTC+8)

Results

Round 1

Heat 1

Heat 2

Heat 3

Heat 4

Overall results for round 1

Semifinals

Qual. rule: first 5 of each heat (Q) plus the 2 fastest times (q) qualified.

Semifinal 1

The first semifinal was held on 17 August 2008 at 21:55.

Semifinal 2

The second semifinal was held on 17 August 2008 at 22:04.

Final

The final was held on 19 August 2008 at 22:50.

 Splits

References

Athletics at the 2008 Summer Olympics
1500 metres at the Olympics
Men's events at the 2008 Summer Olympics